Sophronica lineata is a species of beetle in the family Cerambycidae. It was described by Francis Polkinghorne Pascoe in 1858. It is known from Ethiopia and Natal.

References

Sophronica
Beetles described in 1858